Pseudo is a 2020 Bolivian film. A political suspense-thriller, the film, directed by Luis Reneo and Gory Patiño, was released to critical and public acclaim.

Plot 
A Bolivian taxi driver steals a passenger's identity, as the passenger appeared to be a well-off photographer and the driver wanted to live a better life. But as it turned out, the passenger was a hit-man who was on a mission to commit a political assassination and the taxi driver thus unwittingly gets involved in a terrorist plot to overtake Bolivia.

Cast 
Cristian Mercado
Milton Cortez
Luigi Antezana
Carla Arana

Availability 
Since 2022 the movie has been shown on some premium cable television networks in the United States.

References 

2020 films
Bolivian drama films
Films set in Bolivia